Conus gubernator, common name the governor cone, is a species of sea snail, a marine gastropod mollusk in the family Conidae, the cone snails and their allies.

Like all species within the genus Conus, these snails are predatory and venomous. They are capable of "stinging" humans, therefore live ones should be handled carefully or not at all.

Description
The size of the shell varies between 50 mm and 106 mm. The whorls of the spire are carinate, channeled and striate. They are tessellated with chestnut. The body whorl is pink-white, longitudinally clouded with chestnut or chocolate, often obscurely two-banded. There are several distant sulci towards the base.

Distribution
This marine species occurs in the Western Indian Ocean off Madagascar, Tanzania, Mauritius, Chagos and the Mascarene Basin.

Gallery
Below are several color forms:

References

 Kiener L.C. 1844–1850. Spécies général et iconographie des coquilles vivantes. Vol. 2. Famille des Enroulées. Genre Cone (Conus, Lam.), pp. 1–379, pl. 1–111 [pp. 1–48 (1846); 49–160 (1847); 161–192 (1848); 193–240 (1849); 241–[379](assumed to be 1850); plates 4,6 (1844); 2–3, 5, 7–32, 34–36, 38, 40–50 (1845); 33, 37, 39, 51–52, 54–56, 57–68, 74–77 (1846); 1, 69–73, 78–103 (1847); 104–106 (1848); 107 (1849); 108–111 (1850)]. Paris, Rousseau & J.B. Baillière
 Puillandre N., Duda T.F., Meyer C., Olivera B.M. & Bouchet P. (2015). One, four or 100 genera? A new classification of the cone snails. Journal of Molluscan Studies. 81: 1–23

External links
 The Conus Biodiversity website
 Cone Shells – Knights of the Sea
 
 Holotype at MNHN, Paris

gubernator
Gastropods described in 1792